Arthur Sneyers was a sailor from Belgium, who represented his country at the 1928 Summer Olympics in Amsterdam, Netherlands. Sneyers, as crew member on the Belgian 6 Metre Ubu, took 5th place with helmsman A. J. J. Fridt and fellow crew members Ludovic Franck, Frits Mulder and Willy Van Rompaey.

Sources

External links
 

Sailors at the 1928 Summer Olympics – 6 Metre
Olympic sailors of Belgium
Belgian male sailors (sport)
Year of birth missing
Possibly living people